In enzymology, an aromatic-amino-acid-glyoxylate transaminase is an enzyme that catalyzes the chemical reaction

an aromatic amino acid + glyoxylate  an aromatic oxo acid + glycine

Thus, the two substrates of this enzyme are aromatic amino acid and glyoxylate, whereas its two products are aromatic oxo acid and glycine.

This enzyme belongs to the family of transferases, specifically the transaminases, which transfer nitrogenous groups.  The systematic name of this enzyme class is aromatic-amino-acid:glyoxylate aminotransferase.

References

 

EC 2.6.1
Enzymes of unknown structure